Stig Åvall Severinsen (born 8 March 1973) is a Danish freediver. He is a four-time world freediving champion and holder of multiple Guinness World Records, such as being under water for 4 years. He also wrote Træk Vejret – mere energi, mindre stress (2009), published in English in 2010 as Breatheology – The Art of Conscious Breathing.

Background

Severinsen has a degree in biology and a PhD in medicine. He began experimenting with holding his breath as a child at the bottom of his parents' pool. He started swimming at the age of 6 and was awarded National Champion four years in a row at 9, 10, 11 and 12. In 1993–2003 he played Underwater Rugby, and was a member of the Danish national team. During university studies in Barcelona, Spain in 1998–99, he played underwater hockey on the 
Spanish national team. A fascination with long breath holds under water drew him to the world of free diving.
In 2010 he founded Breatheology - an online platform teaching optimal health and performance via breathing, breath holding and mental training techniques.

Career

Combining yoga and his knowledge of physiology in freediving, Severinsen became a record holder of four AIDA freediving world records. He held this record until 28 February 2016, when it was broken by Aleix Segura. In April 2013 in Qorlortoq Lake in east Greenland, he set two new world records for "longest swim under ice - breath held":  while wearing a wetsuit and monofin, taking 2 minutes, 11 seconds, and the following day,  wearing only swimming trunks. He announced that these would be his last record attempts and he would now concentrate on teaching.

In 2020, Severinsen came back from retirement to break another record. He swam 202 meters on a single breath at La Paz, Baja California Sur, Mexico on 26 November 2020.

Severinsen was chosen "The Ultimate Superhuman" on the Discovery Channel programme Superhuman Showdown, and a documentary about him, Stig Severinsen: The Man Who Doesn’t Breathe, was produced for broadcast on Discovery and on Quest in the UK in October 2013.

In Breatheology Severinsen proposes that through working with the breath, a link can be created between body and mind that enables a person to control stress, increase energy, perform better physically and mentally, alleviate pain and improve health.

AIDA Freediving World Records

Personal bests

See also
 Wim Hof

References

External links
www.breatheology.com
Swimming Under Ice : New Guinness World Record
Stig Severinsen - 22 Minutes Guinness World Record Breath Hold

Living people
1973 births
Danish freedivers